Horrible Histories is a series of illustrated history books published in the United Kingdom by Scholastic, and part of the Horrible Histories franchise. The books are written by Terry Deary, Peter Hepplewhite, and Neil Tonge, and illustrated by Martin Brown, Mike Phillips, Philip Reeve, and Kate Sheppard.

The first titles in the series, The Terrible Tudors and The Awesome Egyptians, were published in June 1993. As of 2011, with more than 60 titles, the series had sold over 25 million copies in over 30 languages. The books have had tie-ins with newspapers such as The Telegraph, as well as audio-book tie-ins distributed with breakfast cereals.

Concept and creation

Development
Terry Deary studied at drama college and worked as an actor-teacher at the TIE company in Wales. He then became a theatre director and began to write plays for children.  Many of his TIE plays were eventually rewritten and adapted into the Horrible Histories book series. Deary said "I was in this small touring company, taking plays for children round Welsh village halls. I did find I had this facility for knocking ideas into scripts."

By the time the idea of Horrible Histories was presented to him by his publisher, Deary had written around 50 children's novels. The Guardian explains, "they wanted a 'history joke book' and—when he protested that he knew nothing about history–offered to provide the facts to go with the gags." Deary explains the series' inception thus: "The publishers originally asked for a joke book with a history theme. They said, 'Put in a few interesting facts to break up the jokes because some of your jokes are very bad.' And when I looked at the facts, I found they were much more interesting than the jokes. So we ended up with a fact book with jokes. We created a new genre."

The fifth book in the series, Blitzed Brits, was published in 1995, by chance coinciding with the 50th anniversary of VE day. The book reached number one on the bestseller list. Deary decided the book only gave the British viewpoint during World War II and in the interests of balance wrote Woeful Second World War which focused on the wartime experiences in France, Poland, Germany, and Russia. This book was published in September 1999, which coincided with the 60th anniversary of the outbreak of World War II.

In 2003, to celebrate the 10th anniversary of the Horrible Histories book series, Scholastic held a competition to find Horrible Histories Brainiest Boffin. 500 applicants were invited to answer a series of questions, as well as submit an original design for a birthday card. The resulting six regional finalists were then invited to London to appear before Deary himself playing the role of quizmaster in a mock-up TV studio complete with Roman Pillars and Egyptian mummies. A glittering party followed.

Deary eventually returned to the stage. Mad Millennium was commissioned by director Phil Clark, who was a fellow TIE participant 25 years before. He suggested turning the books into large-scale theatre productions. Deary was happy to return to writing plays.

In 2007, the original series began to be republished with a new look and new content. The new books had altered information on the back cover, an index, and a brighter, redesigned front cover. Around the same time the Horrible Histories live-action TV series aired; many of the books were republished as TV tie-ins. In 2013, many of the books were republished in a "20 horrible years" theme.

By the early 2010s, Deary decided that the series had naturally come to an end. He said, "It has had a good run, it's had a better run than most children's series", and added that while his publishers have not officially stopped the series, there was "a general feeling" it would finish. The Guardian explains, "Deary long ago handed over the reins for [his franchise], saying he's more than happy to leave it in the hands of others." This includes to companies like the Birmingham Stage Company that puts on stage plays adapted from his books, and CBBC that has broadcast an award-winning live-action adaption of his books since 2009. The Horrible Histories franchise has expanded into video games, toys, magazines, and a game show.

Educational goals

Deary commented in an interview, "If I had it my way, I wouldn't have schools at all. They don't educate, they just keep kids off the streets. But my books educate because they prepare kids for life ... It's outrageous, why don't we start telling children the truth about history? I hope my books do just that."

The Horrible Histories series was written with the express intention of engaging and enthusing the reader on various historical topics while appearing subversive, primarily aiming to entertain with a background purpose of being educational as well. Deary had stated that when writing the series he viewed himself as a child who wishes to share knowledge with other children, and as a writer who wishes to "entertain first and inform second". He does not respect authors who follow either extreme, that is, those who either only inform or only entertain. He believes that "readers are more important than writers and their needs have to come first" and that if the writer engages the reader, they will retain more knowledge from the work. The series has a skeptical view on the accuracy and validity of history. An introduction to one of the books in series states, "History can be horrible. Horribly hard to learn. The trouble is it keeps on changing ... In history, a 'fact' is sometimes not a fact at all. Really it's just someone's 'opinion'. And opinions can be different for different people ... Teachers will try to tell you there are 'right' and 'wrong' answers even if there aren't."

Many of Deary's books are intended to convey serious political messages underneath the humour presented. In the series, he has often inserted commentary concerning social issues in the 21st century, contrasting them to those of previous centuries. Deary has also inserted commentary rhetorically questioning the reader's morals and patriotism. He has stated in a Guardian interview that his political outlook was inspired by his anti-imperialist viewpoints, and he intended to portray history as the weak being oppressed by the strong. As he continued in the interview, "the last chapter of Ruthless Romans portrays modern-day Zimbabwe and essentially asks, is this any different?" The musical stage show Barmy Britain, co-written by Deary, "features a finale whose sarcastic references to burger bars, bankers, and internet dating leave its young audience in little doubt that whatever the crazed excesses of our ancestors, future generations will doubtless consider us every bit as loopy."

Deary has expressed strong anti-establishment viewpoints. According to Deary, "I was beaten, bullied and abused at school in the name of passing exams. It taught me nothing and I had to break out. So I started challenging authority at school, really, and just kind of never stopped." He did not reply to Tony Blair's invitation to visit 10 Downing Street, telling The Guardian, "The only politician ever to have entered parliament with honourable intentions, was Guy Fawkes." He also declined an invitation to meet the Queen and said he was "deeply disappointed" that the BBC's diamond jubilee coverage included a Horrible Histories sketch live from Tower Bridge.

Deary uses researchers for all Horrible Histories often in specialized fields, such as a military history. While researching his books, he immerses himself in the period so he is in the right context, compiling much more information than he needs. He tends to exclude all the 'boring facts' such as dates, because, he maintains "dates don't matter. Human experience matters." He wishes to avoid 'preaching' the value of history, instead focusing on the wonders of human nature and asking how we each would behave in other people's shoes.

Deary uses many generic literary conventions to make his books more accessible to his readers. He deliberately writes in prose styles that follow natural speech cadences. He also frequently uses alliteration and assonance. Deary considered poetry to be "another weapon in the writer's armory" rather than a specialized form that may only be used in specific circumstances. He maintains that the impersonal language used in textbooks alienates the reader. He, therefore, uses the second person to talk directly to the reader, as if he were talking to them in real life. He views Horrible Histories as one of the few non-fiction or fiction series which utilize this "underused style of writing".

Deary uses the newspaper style to make the serious material more accessible so that the reader approaches the piece in "a more relaxed frame of mind than they would a school text", as in an article about the massacre at Lidice. Newspapers are also used to illustrate light-hearted stories, such as might appear in a tabloid. Newspaper extracts, along with letters and diaries, are used to tell stories from the perspectives of individual people, in order "to get away from the objective, and to get [his] readers to view history subjectively."

When writing about events and historical periods that are still in living memory, such as the Second World War, the series aims to maintain sensitivity. Deary argues that a story about a Tudor executioner who needs ten hacks to chop off someone's head, for example, can, however, afford to be comical as contemporary society is so far removed from the event. Deary believes it is important for children to know about recent events, such as The Holocaust, not relegating them as taboo subjects that cannot be discussed. When informed by a Jewish mother that her Rabbi told her not to introduce her children to the Holocaust before 13 years old, and that her 6-year-old had read it in Horrible Histories, Deary replied: "Sorry, but what am I supposed to do – lie to children?". He has commented that the books do have borders they will not cross. They would not, for example, describe violence against babies, such as the Vikings inflicted, and aside from some snogging, the series does not venture into the realms of sex.

The majority of the series' demographic are 'reluctant readers', who like books where they can "pick one up, read a small section, and then put it down again." Deary attributes this to the use of short chapters, the fact that one may read the book in a non-linear order, and the varying uses of media in each book, such as quizzes and comic strips.

Publication history

Book series

There are 23 books in the original Horrible Histories book series. The first titles in the series, The Terrible Tudors and The Awesome Egyptians, were published in 1993 and 1994. The series also includes two-in-one books, a box set, special books, handbooks, city guides, comic-strips, annuals, novelty books, and more.

Deary announced that the series would officially come to an end in 2013. The Telegraph said, "After Deary was reported to have given up the bestselling series because he had run out of tales to tell ... his publisher would not risk putting out any new ones." Deary says he cannot write a new book unless commissioned. He has not been told to stop writing but neither has he explicitly been asked to continue, citing as a probable cause the gamble involved in publishing a new book. He believes that "...when you've got 60 titles there that you can rework and freshen up for the new audiences that are growing up all the time writing new books can be seen as unacceptably risky in the current publishing climate."

Translations
The books have been issued in Denmark since 1997 by the publishing house Egmont. In Poland, the series' common name, Strrraszna historia, includes Strrraszna historia (Horrible Histories),  Strrraszne sławy (Horribly Famous), and Sławy z krypty (Dead Famous).  There is also a sub-series describing various aspects of Polish history and society (written by Małgorzata Fabianowska and Małgorzata Nesteruk, illustrated by Jędrzej Łaniecki). These titles were written and published exclusively in Poland and have not yet been published in English.

 Ci Sprytni Słowianie (The Clever Slavs) (Slavs)
 Pokrętni Piastowie (Piast Dynasty) (Piast Dynasty)
 Dynamiczna Dynastia Jagiellonów (Dynamic Jagiellon Dynasty) (Jagiellon Dynasty)
 Sakramencki Sarmatyzm (Bloody Sarmatism) (Sarmatism)
 Atrakcyjni Królowie Elekcyjni (Sovereign Election Appeal) (Polish elections and Polish Elective Monarchy)
 Zagmatwane Zabory – (Invasive Embroilment) (Partitions of Poland)
 Nieznośna Niepodległość (Vexing Independence) (History of Poland)

The collection Os Horríveis (The Horribles) in Portugal and Saber Horrível (Horrible knowledge) in Brazil are designed to create interest in history, geography, science and other school subjects. The collection has become a great commercial success. In Brazil, Saber Horrível is published by Editora Melhoramentos and has sold more than one million copies.  In Portugal, the collection Os Horríveis is published by Publicações Europa-América and is subdivided into História Horrível (Horrible History), Ciência Horrível (Horrible Science), Geografia Horrível (Horrible Geography) and Cultura Horrível (Horrible Culture).

The Czech version is known as Děsivé dějiny (Horrible History). As well as translating the English books, it also includes translations of the Polish sub-series. Other books are specific to Czech History, such as Děsné české dějiny (Horrible Czech History). They are mainly written by Roman Ferstl, however, Martin Pitro wrote Pyskatí Habsburkové. The first Horrible Histories video game was published in Germany, translating the series' titled Schauderhafte Geschichten.

The Dutch series Waanzinnig om te weten (Amazing to know) is a translation and an adaptation of the English series Horrible Histories, Horrible Science, Horrible Geography and Murderous Maths, but not all books from all series have been translated into Dutch. As of January 2009, this series includes 36 books.

Other translations into include Thai and Spanish. Cut-Throat Celts is known as Y Celtiaid Cythryblus in the Welsh edition.

Reception

Critical reception
Horrible Histories has received much praise and been generally well received. It is cited as a non-fiction series which has successfully used a formula to entice young children into reading: "The information here is densely packed, at a suitable level for Key Stages 2 and 3, historically accurate and complete with cautions about history being interpretive, but the success lies in the humorous and varied way that the subjects are presented." In Words, words, words, Janet Allen notes the books are "delightful combinations of cartoons, graphs and charts, narration, letters and wanted posters that convey a vast amount of information about those periods." Other critics also praise the wide variety of media in the books, such as recipes, quizzes and newspaper extracts; use of comic strip is particularly noted. The series is also recognised as an effective trigger for debates in English lessons. The Daily Telegraph wrote "Terry Deary is the most influential historian in Britain today."

The books' humour has been identified as a major aspect of the series' success along with the story-telling skill. The series is notable for being historical non-fiction that young people read for pleasure, the first of its kind, pioneering a genre. Consuming history by Jerome De Groot, cites Horrible Histories as a series which demonstrates the "flexibility and dynamism of the 'historical' form" in children's books, another possible market for those types of books. It explains that the books "play on children's fascination with goriness" and that they are "mischievous, irreverent and iconoclastic, appealing to a child audience's desire for silly jokes, presenting history as something tactile and simple." Interactivity is attributed to the re-printable recipes and "what would you do?" multiple choice sections. Groot compares the use of illustration to Glenn Thompson's For Beginners comic books of the mid-1980s. Horrible Histories are noted for making "heavy use of visual and verbal textual interplay". While the series' direct address to its child audience makes it a popular choice for independent reading, it can make the books ineffective as read-aloud books due to their personalized style of writing and the visual aspects of the books. However, some teachers have reported using these books in a read-aloud manner. Consuming history by Jerome De Groot suggests that "the series' wider popularity is due to their tone and style rather than their content".

While discussing the graphic violence in games such as Counter-Strike, Grand Theft Auto and Half Life, the author Judy Arnall notes that children in many societies, current and historical, often witness events much more horrific than those featured in the games. She cites The Wicked History of the World as giving a good context for this.

Controversy
The book Bloody Scotland drew the ire of the Scottish Separatist Group, who claimed it promoted a "UK centric, anti-Scottish viewpoint of Scottish history". They pointed to a featured haggis recipe: "cook the haggis until it looks like a hedgehog after the fifteenth lorry has run over it". They reported the book to the Commission for Racial Equality, who rejected their claim. The National Trust was unhappy with Cruel Kings and Mean Queens because it made fun of Prince Charles, the trust's patron, and Queen Elizabeth II. Slimy Stuarts has been accused of anti-Catholic views.

In the series, there are two books entitled The Horrible History of the World and The Wicked History of the World; however, they are the same book with different headings. To confuse things further, compact and mini editions were planned for release at the end of 2007. The same incident occurred with The Horribly Huge Quiz Book/Massive Millennium Quiz Book, and The Mad Millennium/Mad Millennium Play. Also, there were two different covers for Horrible Christmas, as well as new paperback, compact and mini editions. All of this resulted in people buying multiples of the same books.

Many of what are proclaimed as 'facts' are, debatably, exciting myths and legends. The books, for example, claim that Shakespeare invented the evil actions he attributed to Richard III and present Caligula as being insane. Some of these falsities are listed in the song "It's Not True" in the CBBC TV series. Promoting Reading for Pleasure in the Primary School argues that the series provides an extensive level of detail for the subject material, and uses strong, authentic sources.

The series has been described as a "popular iconoclasm, a challenge to standard narratives".
However other critics suggest that this is a "deliberate attempt to provide alternate readings" on principle. Teachers' omniscient authority is undermined in sections such as 'Test Your Teacher', which says "Your teachers will tell you all about the legions and what they wore and how they lived. But they don't know everything." By these tokens, the series could be taken to suggest that formal education provides an approved, abridged version of history, one which leaves out all the gory, interesting bits. Thus certain authors argue that any histories that do not focus on spectacular events are now deemed boring to younger readers. The use of non-linear structure has raised the concern that the books are encouraging shorter concentration spans, that longer narratives develop.

Awards and nominations
 Best Book with Facts in the Blue Peter Book Awards 2000
 Best Book for Knowledge Award at the Blue Peter Book Awards 2001
 Terry Deary tops the list of most-borrowed non-fiction children's authors every year (figures based on the Library Survey).
 Deary was voted the fifth most popular living children's author in a 2005 Guardian survey.

Spin-offs
 Horrible Geography (written by Anita Ganeri and illustrated by Mike Phillips)
 Horrible Science (written by Nick Arnold and illustrated by Tony de Saulles)
 Horribly Famous (previously Dead Famous, written and illustrated by a variety of authors and illustrators)
 Totally (previously The Knowledge, written and illustrated by a variety of authors and illustrators).
 Foul Football (spinoff of Totally)
 Murderous Maths (spinoff of Totally, written by Kjartan Poskitt and illustrated by a variety of artists, the most common being Philip Reeve)
 America's Funny But True History (written by Elizabeth Levy)
 Boring Bible (twelve books written and illustrated by Andy Robb)
 Fair Dinkum Histories (written by Jackie French, illustrated by Peter Sheehan)

References

External links
 The Horrible Zone at Scholastic publications
 Horrible Histories official website
 "Horribly good" 10 May 2003 The Guardian
 Guardian "Writing history" 12 August 2003. Interview with Dreary
 "Terry Deary interview" Daily Telegraph 5 June 2011'
 Episode of Panel Borders featuring Horrible Histories illustrator Martin Brown (6 August 2009)
 Horrible Histories: 20 years of entertaining children
 Talking Books

Book series introduced in 1993
20th-century history books
21st-century history books
 
Series of children's books
Series of history books
Scholastic Corporation books